The western Orphean warbler (Curruca hortensis) is a typical warbler of the genus Curruca. This species occurs in summer around the Mediterranean, through western Europe and extending into northwest Africa. It is migratory, wintering in Sub-Saharan Africa. It is a rare vagrant to northern and north-western Europe.

Taxonomy and etymology
The English name refers to the mythical musician and singer Orpheus. The specific hortensis is Latin for "of a garden", from hortus, "garden".

Two subspecies are unequivocally accepted, but they are now usually considered separate species.

The western Orphean warbler is probably most closely allied to the Arabian warbler, as well as the brown warbler and Yemen warblers which are sometimes placed in Parisoma. They together with the lesser whitethroat group seem to form a distinct clade of typical warblers. The species therein do not appear much alike at first glance, but they all have prominent white throats, lack rufous wing-patches, and usually having dark sides to the head.

Description

At  in length – somewhat larger than a blackcap – this is one of the largest species of typical warblers. The adult males have a plain grey back and whitish underparts. The bill is long and pointed and the legs black. The male has a dark grey head, black eye mask, and white throat. The iris is white. Females and immatures have a paler head and buff underparts; their grey back has a brownish tinge. The iris is dark in young birds. The song is a series of warbling  and scolding notes.

Behaviour and ecology
These small passerine birds are found in open deciduous woodland. 4-6 eggs are laid in a nest in a bush or tree. Like most "warblers", the western Orphean warbler is an insectivore.

External links

Ageing and sexing (PDF; 2.4 MB) by Javier Blasco-Zumeta & Gerd-Michael Heinze

western Orphean warbler
Birds of Southern Europe
Birds of North Africa
Birds of West Africa
western Orphean warbler
western Orphean warbler